Wouter Johannes De Wet Ras  (born 28 January 1954 in Harrismith, Free State, South Africa) is a former South African rugby union player.

Playing career
Ras represented the Eastern Free State Schools team at the annual Craven Week tournament for three consecutive years from 1970 to 1972. After school Ras did his National Service in Pretoria and played for the Northern Transvaal's under-20 team. In 1974, Ras enrolled at the University of the Free State and made his senior provincial debut for Free State.  He went on to play 141 first class matches for Free State and set a number of provincial records.

Ras played two test matches for the Springboks, both as a replacement. His first test match was against the All Blacks in 1976 when he substituted Gerald Bosch after 35 minutes in the second half on the first test at Kings Park, Durban. His second test was in 1980 when he replaced Willie du Plessis at centre during the second half of the second test against the South American Jaguars, also at Kings Park. Ras toured with the Springboks to South America in 1980 and played in three tour matches, scoring 69 points (4 tries, 25 conversions and 1 penalty goal)

Test history

See also
List of South Africa national rugby union players – Springbok no. 488

References

1954 births
Living people
South African rugby union players
South Africa international rugby union players
Free State Cheetahs players
People from Harrismith
Rugby union players from the Free State (province)
Rugby union centres
Rugby union fly-halves